Euphaedra subferruginea is a butterfly in the family Nymphalidae. It is found in the Central African Republic and the Democratic Republic of the Congo (Ubangi).

References

Butterflies described in 1904
subferruginea